Charles Franklin Walker (September 22, 1894 – September 16, 1974) was a Major League Baseball center fielder who played for five seasons. He played for the Detroit Tigers from 1917 to 1918, the Philadelphia Athletics from 1920 to 1921, and the New York Giants in 1925. He attended Randolph-Macon College and managed a number of years in the minor leagues.

External links

1894 births
1974 deaths
Major League Baseball center fielders
Baseball players from South Carolina
Detroit Tigers players
Philadelphia Athletics players
New York Giants (NL) players
Minor league baseball managers
Newport News Shipbuilders players
Springfield Reapers players
Portland Beavers players
Rocky Mount Tar Heels players
Rocky Mount Broncos players
Indianapolis Indians players
Greenville Spinners players
Atlanta Crackers players
Florence Pee Deans players